"Victory Over the Sun" is a song by Scottish alternative rock band Biffy Clyro that was released as the fourth single from the band's sixth studio album, Opposites (2013), on 8 September 2013.

The band released the official video on YouTube on 25 July 2013.

The song is a playable track in the video game Guitar Hero Live.

Track listing

References

Biffy Clyro songs
2013 songs
2013 singles
14th Floor Records singles
Songs written by Simon Neil
Song recordings produced by Garth Richardson